Leslie Emi Kobayashi (born October 9, 1957) is a United States district judge for the United States District Court for the District of Hawaii.

Early life and education
Kobayashi was born in 1957 in Mount Holly Township, New Jersey. She received her Bachelor of Arts degree from Wellesley College in 1979 and her Juris Doctor from the Boston College Law School in 1983.

Professional career
Kobayashi worked as a trial attorney and managing partner of the law firm of Fujiyama, Duffy & Fujiyama in Honolulu for a period of 17 years. She worked as a deputy prosecuting attorney in Honolulu before becoming a United States magistrate judge on August 2, 1999. In 2000 and 2001, she taught at the William S. Richardson School of Law.

Federal judicial service

On April 21, 2010, Kobayashi was nominated to a seat as a United States district judge of the United States District Court for the District of Hawaii by Barack Obama. She was nominated to fill the seat vacated by Helen Gillmor who took senior status in 2009. The United States Senate confirmed the nomination on December 18, 2010. This makes her the first Japanese American federal judge confirmed during the Obama Administration. She received her commission on December 22, 2010.

See also
List of Asian American jurists

References

External links

1957 births
Living people
20th-century American lawyers
21st-century American judges
21st-century American women judges
American jurists of Japanese descent
Boston College Law School alumni
Hawaii lawyers
Judges of the United States District Court for the District of Hawaii
People from Mount Holly, New Jersey
United States district court judges appointed by Barack Obama
United States magistrate judges
William S. Richardson School of Law faculty
Wellesley College alumni